Lagacé or Lagace is a surname. Notable people with the surname include:

Andre Migner dit Lagacé (born 1640), soldier in the French and Indian Wars and principal ancestor of the Lagacé/Legacy/Lagassé families
Anne Lagacé Dowson (born Toronto, Ontario), award-winning radio journalist
Gisèle Lagacé (born 1970), Canadian writer and illustrator
Jacob Lagacé (born 1990), Canadian ice hockey player
Jean-Guy Lagacé (born 1945), former professional ice hockey defenceman
Maurice E. Lagacé (born 1931), judge currently serving on the Federal Court of Canada
Maxime Lagacé (born 1993), Canadian ice hockey goaltender
Patrick Lagacé (born 1972), French-Canadian journalist
Pierre Lagacé (born 1957), former professional ice hockey centre

See also
Raymond Lagacé Trophy, awarded annually to the Defensive Rookie of the Year in the Quebec Major Junior Hockey League
Lagasse